The Valley National Bank branch in Casa Grande, Arizona, is a commercial building in that city's downtown. It was built in 1950 and listed on the National Register of Historic Places in 2002.

History
The building was constructed in 1950 for Valley National Bank of Arizona, the state's most prominent financial institution in the 20th century. It is located on a corner lot facing a major intersection in downtown Casa Grande, centrally located within the original town site.

Valley National was one of the first banks in the state to open branches in its smaller communities. In 1934, the bank opened its first branch in town; this location was in use until 1991.

The location of the building, at the intersection of Second Street and Florence, is also important to its history. In the 1940s, Casa Grande began to experience prosperity, further accelerating new, automobile-centric development not along Main Street and the railroad. The northern area of town developed such that by 1952, Second Street, not Main Street, represented the main highway through Casa Grande.

Architecture
The building has a T-shaped layout, with an entry canopy that makes the building more rectangular in shape. The exterior also features accents of concrete and cast stone.

Important features include the exterior canopy, windows and doors. The canopy is concrete with a brick support column, while the windows are large plate glass with aluminum frames, placed in several groupings.

The building is highly horizontal; the canopy's inclusion as a soffit across the facade and the banks of windows help emphasize this design.

In September 1960, the interior received a remodeling, with a replacement of the windows and doors with new, similar ones. A cast stone motif featuring a thunderbird was added to the canopies.

See also 
List of historic properties in Casa Grande, Arizona

References

Bank buildings on the National Register of Historic Places in Arizona
Commercial buildings completed in 1950
Buildings and structures in Casa Grande, Arizona
National Register of Historic Places in Pinal County, Arizona